Counter Drain railway station was a remote station in Lincolnshire serving the village of Tongue End. It was on the route of the Spalding and Bourne Railway (opened 1866), later part of the Midland and Great Northern Joint Railway which ran across East Anglia to the Norfolk Coast. The station opened with the line on 1 August 1866, closed temporarily between 9 October 1880 and 1 February 1881, and closed permanently on 2 March 1959, although the line remained open for goods until 1964.

References

External links
 Counter Drain Station on 1946 O. S. map

Disused railway stations in Lincolnshire
Former Midland and Great Northern Joint Railway stations
Railway stations in Great Britain opened in 1866
Railway stations in Great Britain closed in 1880
Railway stations in Great Britain opened in 1881
Railway stations in Great Britain closed in 1959
1866 establishments in England